False billing is a fraudulent act of invoicing or otherwise requesting funds from an individual or firm without showing obligation to pay. Such notices are, for example, often sent to owners of domain names, purporting to be legitimate renewal notices, although not originating from the owner's own registrar.

Finance fraud